Yan Yanming (Chinese: 闫彦明) (1983 – January 18, 2005) was a Chinese mass murderer who entered a dormitory at the Ruzhou Number Two High School in Ruzhou, China on November 26, 2004, with a knife and attacked twelve boys, killing nine of them.

After the attack, Yanming ran away from the school, but was arrested hours later after he failed to commit suicide because his mother had reported his location to the Ruzhou police.

After trial, Yanming was sentenced to death and executed on January 18, 2005 in Pingdingshan.

References

External links
Man held for slashing teens, news24.com (November 26, 2004)
Mother turns son in for Chinese school killings, CBC News (November 26, 2004)
In China, police detain man accused of killing up to 9 boys, The Boston Globe (November 27, 2004)
Man held over China school deaths, BBC News (November 26, 2004)
Eight boys killed at China school, BBC News (November 26, 2004)
Nine boys slain at school dorm, The Spokesman-Review (November 27, 2004)
Eight students killed in a Henan high school, China Daily (November 26, 2004)
Knifeman kills eight in Chinese school dormitory, The Times (November 26, 2004)
Knife attacker kills eight Chinese children in their beds, The Guardian (November 27, 2004)
Knifeman kills 8 boys in school dormitory, Daily Telegraph (November 27, 2004)
8 children killed in China school, CNN (November 26, 2004)
Eight teens killed in school knife rampage, The Sydney Morning Herald (November 26, 2004)
Man held after eight killed in school stabbings, The Sydney Morning Herald (November 28, 2004)
Man killed teens over 'privacy invasion', The Sydney Morning Herald (November 28, 2004)
Suspect seized for killing 8 students in Henan, People's Daily (November 27, 2004)
8 People Slashed to Death in Chinese High School, The Washington Post (November 26, 2004)
8 teenagers killed in school attack, The Japan Times (December 4, 2004)
Killer of 9 students gets death sentence, Xinhua (January 20, 2005)
Mother turns in son accused of school killings, The Victoria Advocate (November 28, 2004)
China executes man who killed nine students in their dormitory, The Victoria Advocate (January 20, 2005)
China Executes School Knife Killer, Fox News (January 20, 2005)

1983 births
2005 deaths
2004 murders in China
21st-century Chinese criminals
21st-century executions by China
Chinese male criminals
Chinese mass murderers
Chinese people convicted of murder
Executed mass murderers
Executed people from Henan
Executed People's Republic of China people
Male murderers
21st-century mass murder in China
Mass stabbings in China
People convicted of murder by the People's Republic of China
People executed by China by firearm
People from Pingdingshan
Violence against men in Asia
Incidents of violence against boys